Eemil Nestor Setälä (27 February 1864 – 8 February 1935) was a Finnish politician and once the Chairman of the Senate of Finland, from September 1917 to November 1917, when he was author of the Finnish Declaration of Independence.

Setälä was a linguist, professor of Finnish language and literature at Helsinki University from 1893 to 1929. He was a major influence on the study of Finnish language, and the founder of the research institute Suomen suku ("The Family of the Finnish Language").

Life

Setälä was born in 1864. In 1892 he married the writer and editor, Helmi Krohn, and she took the name Setälä which she used until they divorced in 1913. A divorce was unusual at this time in Finland.

Architect and writer Salme Setälä was their daughter.

His political activities led him to be elected several times to the parliament, for the Young Finnish Party and for the National Coalition Party. For a brief period at the end of World War I, he served as acting head of state as the Chairman of the Senate. Later Setälä held cabinet posts as of the minister of education (1925) and the Foreign Minister (1925-1926). 

He was the Envoy of Finland to Denmark and Hungary from 1927 to 1930.

From 1926 to 1935 he was Chancellor of the University of Turku.  

He is buried in the Hietaniemi Cemetery in Helsinki.

References

External links
 E.N. Setälä in 375 humanists 21.02.2015, Faculty of Arts, University of Helsinki

1864 births
1935 deaths
People from Kokemäki
People from Turku and Pori Province (Grand Duchy of Finland)
Young Finnish Party politicians
National Coalition Party politicians
Finnish senators
Ministers of Education of Finland
Ministers for Foreign Affairs of Finland
Members of the Diet of Finland
Members of the Parliament of Finland (1907–08)
Members of the Parliament of Finland (1908–09)
Members of the Parliament of Finland (1910–11)
Members of the Parliament of Finland (1917–19)
Members of the Parliament of Finland (1919–22)
Members of the Parliament of Finland (1922–24)
Members of the Parliament of Finland (1924–27)
People of the Finnish Civil War (White side)
Linguists from Finland
Finnish Finno-Ugrists
University of Helsinki alumni
Academic staff of the University of Helsinki
Burials at Hietaniemi Cemetery
Chancellors of the University of Turku